
Year 607 (DCVII) was a common year starting on Sunday (link will display the full calendar) of the Julian calendar. The denomination 607 for this year has been used since the early medieval period, when the Anno Domini calendar era became the prevalent method in Europe for naming years.

Events 
 By place 
 Europe 
 Visigoths, Austrasians, Neustrians and Lombards form an alliance against King Theuderic II of Burgundy, whose grandmother and sister have murdered Theuderic's wife Ermenberga, daughter of Witteric, king of the Visigoths. Fighting takes place around Narbonne, but little is known of the details or outcome (approximate date).
 Queen Brunhilda has Uncelen, Duke of Alemannia, removed from office after his foot is cut off as revenge for Protadius' death (according to the Lex Alamannorum).

 Britain 
 King Ceolwulf of Wessex fights the South Saxons.

 Asia 
 August 1 – Empress Suiko appoints Ono no Imoko as official envoy to the Sui Court (Japanese missions to Imperial China). She sends him to pay tribute to Emperor Yángdi, and let him deliver the famous letter from prince-regent Shōtoku which begins: "The Son of Heaven where the sun rises (Japan), to the Son of Heaven where the sun sets (China), may good health be with you." (Traditional Japanese date: July 3, 607).
 Yángdi is offended by his general Gao Jiong, who makes several comments critical of the emperor's policies, against Tujue submissive Yami Qaghan. He is executed (beheaded), and Gao's sons are exiled to the border provinces (Northern China).

 By topic 
 Religion 
 February 19 – The vacancy (sede vacante) that has existed on the papal throne, since the death last year of Sabinian, ends with the election of a Rome-born deacon of the Catholic Church. Pope Boniface III is appointed as the 66th pope, but dies the same year.
 Emperor Phocas bestows the title "Universal Bishop" upon Boniface III, in an effort to improve relations with Rome.
 October 11 – Thomas I is appointed as the 60th patriarch of Constantinople.
 The Hōryū-ji Buddhist temple in Ikaruga, near Nara (Japan), is constructed.

Births 
 Ali ibn Abi Talib, ruler of the Rashidun Caliphate (d. 661)
 Hao Chujun, general of the Tang Dynasty (d. 681)
 Shenxiu, Chinese Zen Buddhist patriarch (d. 706) 
 Yang Gao, prince of the Sui Dynasty (d. 618)

Deaths 
 November 12 – Pope Boniface III
 Desiderius, archbishop of Vienne (approximate date)
 Gao Jiong, general of the Sui Dynasty
 Trudpert, Irish missionary (or 644)

References